Iberina is a genus of dwarf sheet spiders that was first described by Eugène Simon in 1881.

Species
 it contains six species:
Iberina candida (Simon, 1875) – Europe, North Africa, Turkey, Israel
Iberina difficilis (Harm, 1966) – France, Italy, Central Europe, Romania
Iberina ljovuschkini Pichka, 1965 – Russia (Caucasus)
Iberina mazarredoi Simon, 1881 (type) – Spain, France
Iberina microphthalma (Snazell & Duffey, 1980) – Britain, Switzerland, Germany, Czech Rep., Hungary
Iberina montana (Blackwall, 1841) – Europe, Turkey

References

Araneomorphae genera
Hahniidae
Spiders of Asia
Taxa named by Eugène Simon